A stillbirth is the death of a fetus before or during delivery, resulting in the delivery of a dead baby.

Stillbirth may also refer to:

 Stillbirth (album), by Oneiroid Psychosis, 1995
 "Stillbirth" (song), by Alice Glass, 2015

See also
 Stillborn (disambiguation)